Badri may refer to:

Films
 Badri (2000 film), Telugu movie
 Badri (2001 film), Tamil movie

People

Surname
 Omar el-Badri, Libyan politician, 7th Secretary General of OPEC
 Abdallah Salem el-Badri, Libyan politician, 20th and 27th Secretary General of OPEC
 Abdul Qadir al-Badri, former Prime Minister of Libya
 Balghis Badri, Sudanese feminist activist and social anthropologist
 Haitham al-Badri, Al-Qaeda in Iraq member
Abu Bakr al-Baghdadi, born Ibrahim al-Badri
Abd al-Aziz al-Badri, Iraqi Islamic scholar
Saleh al-Badri, Iraqi poet
Faisal Al Badri, Libyan footballer
Salem Amer Al-Badri, Kenyan middle-distance runner
Anice Badri, Tunisian professional footballer
Hossam El Badry, Egyptian football coach and former player

Given name
 Badri Patarkatsishvili, Georgian businessman
 Badri Kvaratskhelia, Georgian-Azerbaijani footballer
 Badri (director), Tamil film director

Arabic-language surnames